Generale di squadra aerea (General of an aerial squadron or Aerial squadron general) is a rank in the Italian Air Force, equivalent to that of air marshal in the Royal Air Force.

References 

Italian Air Force
Air force ranks
Military ranks of Italy